Astaneh-ye Ashrafiyeh County is in Gilan province, Iran. The capital of the county is the city of Astaneh-ye Ashrafiyeh. At the 2006 census, the county's population was 107,801 in 32,202 households. The following census in 2011 counted 105,526 people in 35,280 households. At the 2016 census, the county's population was 108,130 in 38,824 households.

Administrative divisions

The population history of Astaneh-ye Ashrafiyeh County's administrative divisions over three consecutive censuses is shown in the following table. The latest census shows two districts, six rural districts, and two cities.

References

 

Counties of Gilan Province